Guillermo Vilas (born 17 August 1952) is an Argentine former professional tennis player. Vilas was the No. 1 of the Grand Prix seasons in 1974, 1975 and 1977, and won four Grand Slam tournaments, one year-end Masters, and a total of 62 ATP titles. World Tennis, Agence France-Presse and Livre d'or du tennis 1977 (Christian Collin-Bernard Ficot), among other rankings and publications, rated him as world No. 1 in 1977 (while others ranked Björn Borg or Jimmy Connors No. 1). In the ATP computer rankings, he peaked at No. 2 in April 1975, a position he held for a total of 83 weeks. He was inducted into the International Tennis Hall of Fame in 1991, two years after his first retirement.

Known for his prolific match play, especially on clay, he became the second man to win more than 900 matches in the Open Era, and his number of match-wins on clay (659) is by far the most of the era. His peak was the 1977 season during which he won two major titles (both on clay), had two long match win streaks of 46 all-surface and 53 on clay, and finished with an Open Era record of match wins. In 2016, The Daily Telegraph ranked him as the 3rd best male clay-court player of all time, behind Rafael Nadal and Björn Borg. In 2018, Steve Tignor for Tennis Magazine ranked him as the 16th greatest tennis player of the Open Era.

Historical and statistical studies presented in 2015 by Argentinian journalist Eduardo Puppo and Romanian mathematician Marian Ciulpan concluded that Vilas should have been No. 1 in the old ATP ranking system for seven weeks between 1975 and 1976. The ATP Tour and its chief executive at that time, Chris Kermode, although not refuting the data, decided not to officially recognize Vilas. The controversy is still in the legal stage. In October 2020, Netflix released a documentary film about the Vilas case titled "Guillermo Vilas: Settling the Score".

Career
Raised in the seaside resort of Mar del Plata, Vilas was a left-hander and played his first tour event in 1968. He was in the year-ending top ten from 1974 through 1982. He was a clay-court specialist but also played well on hard-court, grass, and carpet surfaces.

He won four Grand Slam titles: the 1977 French Open and the 1977 US Open (both played on clay) and the 1978 and 1979 Australian Open (both played on grass). He was also the runner-up at the French Open three times (1975, 1978, and 1982) and at the Australian Open once (January 1977).

In 1974, he won the year-end Masters Grand Prix title. In addition, he won seven Grand Prix Super Series titles (1975–80), the precursors to the current Masters 1000.

Best year
A left-handed baseliner, Vilas's best year on tour was 1977 when he won two of the four Grand Slam singles tournaments and 16 of the 31 Association of Tennis Professionals tournaments he entered. His playing record for 1977 was 130 wins against 15 losses. Not including the Masters year-end championship, he won 72 of his last 73 ATP matches in 1977. The highest point during this run was winning the last US Open played at Forest Hills against Jimmy Connors 2–6, 6–3, 7–6(7–4), 6–0 in a match where Vilas surprised his American rival by attacking the net.

Winning streak
In 1977 he won seven consecutive titles after Wimbledon—Kitzbühel (clay), Washington (clay), Louisville (clay), South Orange (clay), Columbus (clay), US Open (clay) and Paris (clay)—and set up a 46-match all-surface winning streak. He also had a record 53-match winning streak on clay courts, which stood until surpassed by Rafael Nadal in 2006. Both his winning streaks were terminated in October 1977 by Ilie Năstase in the final of the Raquette d'Or tournament. In that best of five-set final, Vilas dropped the first two sets by 6–1, 7–5 and then retired in protest of Năstase's use of a spaghetti strung racquet (which was banned shortly after by the ITF). After that he won a further 28 matches in a row with titles at Tehran, Bogotá, Santiago, Buenos Aires (all on clay), and Johannesburg (hard). That run was ended in the Masters semi-finals by Björn Borg.

ATP ranking No. 1 controversy
Even though he won 16 ATP singles titles, including the French Open and the US Open and was the runner-up at the January edition of the Australian Open in 1977, Vilas was never ranked by the ATP as world No. 1 during 1977 which was due to the fact that the rankings at the time were based on the average of a player's results. He was instead year-end world No. 2, behind Jimmy Connors (who won the Masters and seven other titles and was the runner-up at Wimbledon and the US Open in 1977). Nevertheless, Vilas was rated number one by World Tennis, France Presse, Tennis de France, Le Livre d'or du Tennis, Gene Scott, Peter Bodo, Christian Quidet, and Michael Sutter. The International Tennis Hall of Fame inscription for Vilas stated "it was generally considered Vilas was the real No. 1 for 1977". Vilas was also rated number one by Bud Collins and John Barrett by the 2010s.

Argentine journalist Eduardo Puppo and Romanian mathematician Marian Ciulpan investigated the 1973–78 period records, and delivered a detailed report with more than 1,200 pages in which they came to the conclusion that Vilas should have been ranked No. 1 for five weeks in 1975 as well as during the first two weeks of 1976 and handed over their research to the ATP at the end of 2014. Although the study was not refuted, in May 2015 the ATP announced it had decided not to make official the No. 1 position for Vilas because it happened in the interval between the publications of the official rankings.

In October 2020, Netflix released a documentary about the controversy titled "Guillermo Vilas: Settling the Score". It also covered (briefly) Evonne Goolagong Cawley's recognition as world no. 1 (for two weeks in 1976) retrospectively by the WTA in 2007.

Retirement
Vilas retired from the ATP Tour in 1989 but still played on the ATP Challenger Series until 1992. He was inducted into the International Tennis Hall of Fame in 1991. Vilas was in the stands at Flushing Meadows to cheer on his countryman, Juan Martín del Potro, who beat Roger Federer in an upset in the 2009 US Open final.

Family

Vilas married Phiangphathu Khumueang in 2005. They have three daughters and one son. They reside in Monaco. He is reportedly suffering from a form of dementia.

Distinctions

 Won the Grand Prix circuit in 1974, 1975, and 1977.
 World Tennis Magazine, France Presse, Michel Sutter and Christian Quidet, among others, ranked him as No. 1 Tennis Player of the Year in 1977.
 Held the Open Era male record for the longest winning streak on clay courts at 53 matches, set in 1977, until it was bettered by Rafael Nadal in 2006. Nadal later extended this to 81 matches.
 Won 62 ATP singles titles (eighth highest during the Open Era) and was the runner-up in 40 singles tournaments (plus two unfinished finals). Won 16 doubles titles with other 10 doubles finals.
 He took Argentina to its first-ever Davis Cup final in 1981 (lost to the United States), together with José Luis Clerc, who was also a top-ten player. The Argentine press often referred to the tensions between the two of them, which even reverberated to the 2004 French Open awards ceremony, in which Vilas presented Gastón Gaudio with his trophy over Clerc's objections.
 Vilas's success on the court led to a surge in popularity of tennis in Argentina and throughout Latin America. Guillermo Cañas and Guillermo Coria were named after him.
 In 2005, TENNIS Magazine put Vilas in 24th place (15th male) in its list of the 40 Greatest Players of the Tennis Open Era, men and women included.

Career statistics

Singles performance timeline

Grand Slam finals

Singles: 8 (4 titles, 4 runner-ups)

Records
 These records were attained in Open Era of tennis.
 ^ Denotes consecutive streak.

Notes

References

External links

 
 
 
 

Argentine male tennis players
Australian Open (tennis) champions
French Open champions
International Tennis Hall of Fame inductees
Tennis players from Buenos Aires
Sportspeople from Mar del Plata
US Open (tennis) champions
1952 births
Living people
Grand Slam (tennis) champions in men's singles
World number 1 ranked male tennis players